The Eighth Federal Electoral District of the Federal District (VIII Distrito Electoral Federal del Distrito Federal) is one of the 300 Electoral Districts into which Mexico is divided for the purpose of elections to the federal Chamber of Deputies and one of 27 such districts in the Federal District ("DF" or Mexico City).

It elects one deputy to the lower house of Congress for each three-year legislative period, by means of the first past the post system.

District territory
Under the 2005 districting scheme, the DF's Eighth District covers:
The borough (delegación) of Cuauhtémoc to the north and west of  Paseo de la Reforma and Calzada de Guadalupe, and
The eastern section of the borough of Azcapotzalco.

Previous districting schemes

1996–2005 district
Between 1996 and 2005, the Eighth District covered the northern portion of Cuauhtémoc only.

Deputies returned to Congress from this district

LI Legislature
1979–1982: Julio César Mena Brito (PRI)
LII Legislature
1982–1985: Lidia Camarena Adame (PRI)
LIII Legislature
1985–1988:
LIV Legislature
1988–1991: Ignacio López Tarso (PRI) 
LV Legislature
1991–1994:
LVI Legislature
1994–1997: Jesús Rodríguez y Rodríguez (PRI)
LVII Legislature
1997–2000: Dolores Padierna (PRD)
LVIII Legislature
2000–2003: Mario Huerta Díaz (PVEM)
LIX Legislature
2003–2006: Dolores Padierna (PRD)
LX Legislature
2006–2009: Armando Barreiro Pérez (PRD)

References and notes

Federal electoral districts of Mexico
Mexico City